Ian Johnstone may refer to:
 Ian Johnstone (footballer)
 Ian Johnstone (broadcaster)

See also
 Ian Johnston (disambiguation)
 Iain Johnstone, film critic
 Iain M. Johnstone, statistician